Brako may refer to:
Pagotto Brako,  Italian ultralight trike aircraft design 
Ben Brako (born 1952), Ghanaian highlife artiste
Kofi Brako (born 1959), Ghanaian politician
Lois Brako (born 1950), American botanist, mycologist and explorer

See also 
 Braco (disambiguation)